Clathroporina is a genus of lichenized fungi in the family Trichotheliaceae. It was circumscribed by Swiss lichenologist Johannes Müller Argoviensis in 1882.

Species
Clathroporina amygdalina 
Clathroporina anoptella 
Clathroporina caudata 
Clathroporina chlorocarpa 
Clathroporina chlorotica 
Clathroporina cinereonigricans 
Clathroporina diphloea 
Clathroporina dominicana 
Clathroporina duplicascens 
Clathroporina elabens 
Clathroporina elliottii 
Clathroporina endochrysea 
Clathroporina exiguella 
Clathroporina foliicola 
Clathroporina fulva 
Clathroporina haultainii 
Clathroporina interrupta 
Clathroporina irregularis 
Clathroporina isidiifera 
Clathroporina japonica 
Clathroporina locuples 
Clathroporina mastoidea 
Clathroporina megapotamica 
Clathroporina nitidula 
Clathroporina ocellata 
Clathroporina pustulosa 
Clathroporina rivularis 
Clathroporina sagedioides 
Clathroporina saxatilis 
Clathroporina subpungens 
Clathroporina superans 
Clathroporina translucens 
Clathroporina turgida 
Clathroporina unculiformis 
Clathroporina verruculosa 
Clathroporina wainiana 
Clathroporina wellingtonii

References

Gyalectales
Lichen genera
Gyalectales genera
Taxa named by Johannes Müller Argoviensis